The 2015 Shanghai Rolex Masters was a tennis tournament played on outdoor hard courts. It was the seventh edition of the Shanghai ATP Masters 1000, classified as an ATP World Tour Masters 1000 event on the 2015 ATP World Tour. It took place at Qizhong Forest Sports City Arena in Shanghai, China from October 11 to October 18, 2015.

Points and prize money

Point distribution

Prize money

Singles main-draw entrants

Seeds

 1 Rankings are as of October 5, 2015

Other entrants
The following players received wildcards into the singles main draw:
  Bai Yan
  Tommy Haas
  Wu Di
  Zhang Ze

The following players received entry from the qualifying draw:
  Nikoloz Basilashvili
  Simone Bolelli
  Łukasz Kubot
  Andrey Kuznetsov
  Lu Yen-hsun
  Albert Ramos Viñolas
  Go Soeda

The following player received entry as a lucky loser:
  Donald Young

Withdrawals
Before the tournament
  Grigor Dimitrov → replaced by  Steve Johnson
  Philipp Kohlschreiber → replaced by  Víctor Estrella Burgos
  Florian Mayer → replaced by  Vasek Pospisil
  Juan Mónaco → replaced by  Gilles Müller
  Gaël Monfils → replaced by  João Sousa
  Benoît Paire → replaced by  Donald Young

Doubles main-draw entrants

Seeds

 Rankings are as of October 5, 2015

Other entrants
The following pairs received wildcards into the doubles main draw:
  Gong Maoxin /  Zhang Ze
  Wu Di /  Zhang Zhizhen

The following pair received entry as alternates:
  Roberto Bautista Agut /  David Marrero

Withdrawals
Before the tournament
  Fernando Verdasco (hip injury)

During the tournament
  Pierre-Hugues Herbert (back injury)

Finals

Singles

 Novak Djokovic def.  Jo-Wilfried Tsonga 6–2, 6–4

Doubles

 Raven Klaasen /  Marcelo Melo def.  Simone Bolelli /  Fabio Fognini 6–3, 6–3

References

External links
Official Website